The Director-General is chief executive and editor-in-chief of the Norwegian Broadcasting Corporation (NRK). The position is appointed by the NRK board, which in turn is appointed by the government.

The title of the Director-General in Norwegian is (since 1948) kringkastingssjef, which literally means "chief of broadcasting".
 
Olav Midttun (1934–1940 and 1945–1947), he held the title of riksprogramsjef, "national chief of programmes" 
Thorstein Diesen, Jr. (1947–1948) (acting riksprogramsjef)
Egil Sundt (1939–1940 and 1945–1946), he held the title of administerende direktør 
Knut Tvedt (acting) (1946–1948), he held the title of administerende direktør
Kaare Fostervoll (1948–1962)
Hans Jacob Ustvedt (1962–1972)
Torolf Elster (1972–1981)
Bjartmar Gjerde (1981–1989)
Olav Ilssen (acting) (1989)
Einar Førde (1989–2001)
John G. Bernander (2001–2007)
Hans Tore Bjerkaas (2007–2013)
Thor Gjermund Eriksen (2013–2022)
Vibeke Fürst Haugen (2022–)

References 

NRK